Banyuwangi Regency is a regency of East Java province in Indonesia. This regency also known as the sun rise of Java because it is located at the easternmost end of Java Island. It serves as a port between Java and Bali. It is surrounded by mountains and forests to the west; by sea to the east and south. Banyuwangi is separated by the Strait of Bali from Bali. With an area of 5,782.4 km2, this regency is the largest in Java. The regency is a tourist destination, and subject to ongoing development as an international tourist destination with relevant infrastructure. Banyuwangi regency has been declared a taman bumi (earth park), or national geological park (Geopark) in 2018.

It had a population of 1,488,791 according to the 2000 Census; by the 2010 Census it had risen to 1,556,078; and at the 2020 Census to 1,708,114. The town of Banyuwangi is the administrative capital. The name Banyuwangi is Javanese for "fragrant water", connected to the Javanese folklore of Sri Tanjung.

Society and history

One Banyuwangi native group is the Osing community which has a Hindu culture although they can be considered as a Javanese sub-ethnic group. They live mainly in the central part of Banyuwangi and they sometimes consider themselves as Majapahit descendants.  Other groups are Javanese (living mostly in the south and west), Madurese (mainly in the north and coastal area) and Balinese (scattered but more concentrated in the east). Other smaller groups include Chinese, Buginese, and Arabs.

Once known as Blambangan (or its variation: Balambangan and Balumbungan), it was a vassal of the Majapahit Kingdom and a regional trade centre. Blambangan's autonomy grew considerably after the end of 14th century A.D. After the Majapahit Kingdom ceased to exist, it became an independent kingdom and, as such, the last Hindu kingdom of Java. In order to defend itself from the troops of the Sultanate of Demak, which tried to occupy it, Blambangan asked for help from Balinese kings, which caused it to lose its independence to Balinese kingdoms. During this time Blambangan was deeply influenced by Balinese culture. After around 150 years of Balinese occupation, the Sultanate of Mataram gained control of the territory and renamed it Banyuwangi. Tawang alun II of Balmbangan freed Balmbangan from Mataram sultanate during Trunojoyo revolt and built the capital of Macan Putih , near modern day Banyuwangi . Later, it was part of the Mataram territory controlled by the VOC (1770). During the expansion of plantations in the 19th century, many parts of Banyuwangi were planted with coffee and sugar cane, which feature its landscape even now. The Chinese and Arabs came mostly during this period.

Banyuwangi people are known for their combination of Islamic and pre-Islamic tradition.

During the Fall of Suharto, a witchhunt in Banyuwangi against alleged sorcerers spiraled into widespread riots and violence. In addition to alleged sorcerers, Islamic clerics were also targeted and killed,  Nahdlatul Ulama members were murdered by rioters.

Culture
The Blambangan Peninsula is one of the remaining places in Java where Hindu culture is still retained, having a Balinese influence.

Gandrung Dance

This is a Banyuwangi-typical dance which performed by a woman and along with simple music like violin, triangle (called ), gong (or kempul), kendhang and sometimes with keyboard as result of modern influence. It is performed during night until dawn particularly in parties.

Janger or Damarwulan
Damarwulan is a legendary hero who features in traditional theatre art which has been developed since the 19th century in Banyuwangi. It is a combination of Balinese, Javanese and local cultures. Balinese influences can be seen in its performers' costumes and instruments. Meanwhile, Javanese influences is in its "lakon" or stories as well as language in dialogues. It is distinct from the Balinese Janger.

Administrative districts

At the time of the 2010 Census, Banyuwangi Regency was divided into twenty-four districts, but an additional district - Blimbingsari - was subsequently created. The twenty-five districts are listed below with their areas and their populations at the 2020 Census and the 2020 Census. The table also includes the locations of the district administrative centres, the number of villages (rural desa and urban kelurahan) in each district, and its postal codes.

Note: (a) included 10 small offshore islands. (b) includes small offshore islands of Pulau Parengan and Pulau Watulayar. (c) The 2010 population of the new Blimbingsari District is included in the figures for the districts from which it was cut out. (d) includes small offshore islands of Pulau Boom and Pulau Santen. (e) includes small offshore island of Pulau Tabuan.

Transportation
Banyuwangi International Airport at Blimbingsari serves the regency, Banyuwangi city and surrounding area of East Java. Banyuwangi can be reached by road and rail from Surabaya or by ferry from Bali.

Tourism

Many European tourists visiting Bali come to Banyuwangi to surf in Plengkung and dive in Tabuhan Island. Ferries from Bali arrive at the port of Ketapang, some 8 km to the north of Banyuwangi city. Plekung Beach is also known as G-Land or green land have 3 types of waves up to 6 to 8 meters tall.

Banyuwangi International Surfing Competition 2014
This was the second time competition after the 2012 competition. 23–25 May 2014 competition is followed by at least 15 countries in Pantai Pulau Merah (Red Island Beach) which has 4 meters height and 400 meters long of waves.

Diamond Triangle
Diamond Triangle consists of:
 Ijen Crater Nature Tourist Park, we can see tosca lake crater and traditional sulphur mining which the sulphur bunch mobilization still use human to hike and down to the crater.
 Alas Purwo National Park, besides see the animals we can surf at G-Land/Plengkung with Money Trees, Speddy's, Kongs, Twenty-twenty and Tiger Track waves.
 Meru Betiri National Park, Sukamade Turtle Breeding Station regularly releases baby marine turtles to open ocean. 4 of 6 kind of turtles can be found in Indonesia regularly visit Sukamade to put their eggs. Penyu Hijau (Chelonia mydas) visit the Sukamade Beach almost everynight, Penyu Lekang (Lepidochelys olivacea) visit in March to June, Penyu Belimbing (Dermochelys coriacea) put the egg every 4 years in June to September and the scare Penyu Sisik (Eremochelys olivacea) very seldom to visit the beach.

Waterfalls
Visitors may be interested to find several waterfalls in one locality.  Opened formally in 2014, there are a number of waterfalls in Kampung Anyar (New Village), near Kalibendo Plantation, around 15 kilometers from Banyuwangi on the way to Mount Ijen. There are 3 waterfalls near to each other known as the "Triple Waterfall" to be found 10 minutes walk down the stairs from a parking area. Or about 300 meters along the river, walking uphill, Kethagen Waterfall can be found. The cliff besides the river can reflect sunlight, glittering like diamonds.

Climate
Banyuwangi has a temperate tropical and wet dry climate, similar to Banyuwangi's dry season start from May until October, and the rest is wet season. in 2013, Banyuwangi's highest average temperature is on October with 28.2 °C and lowest average temperature is on April with 24.8 °C

Environment
The forest and river in Banyuwangi is well-preserved, says the Indonesia Dragonfly Society because they found 3 dragonfly species which only can live in good environment.

Nevertheless, there are local controversies in the Regency over the impact of gold mining activities in the locality of Tumpang Pitu village.  In 2006, the Banywangi regency administration granted a mining licence to one company, PT Indo Multi Niaga, which later transferred the licence to another company.  However, the local community had expressed concern about gold mining activities as early as 1997.  The issues partly related to the protection of the area around a local Hindu temple, partly relate to environmental matters, and partly related to local community views about the economic and social impact of the mining.
In addition, in Banyuwangi city, Kertosari has a Multimedia training center for Vocational High Schools (Vocational High Schools) in Industrial Work Practices in the field of Television, through a place where millennials are creative who are members of Misntv (Media Inspirasi Sahabat Nusantara Televisi). This media is a Media Streaming Network, under the auspices of Mav Entertainment Corporation and Lembaga Sahadat-Qu, which aims to create a new workforce in the field of Television and Journalism that is reliable. The location of the Misntv office is on Jl. Ikan Banyar No. 91 RT. 03 RW. 03 Krajan Kertosari. Hopefully with this training center it can improve the economy at the UMKM  level and the younger generation is able to compete in the digital era. Online Access via YouTube Misntv and Mav Entertainment Corporation

Gallery

References

External links

 Official site Banyuwangi site

 
East Java
Tourist attractions in East Java